Millhouses is a neighbourhood in the City of Sheffield, England. It is located in Ecclesall ward; in the south-western portion of the city on the northwest bank of the River Sheaf. Its origins lie in a small hamlet that grew around the Ecclesall Corn Mill. It has a population (2006 estimate) of 4,424.

The agriculture and industries of this area are now largely gone, leaving Millhouses as a mostly residential area. Local amenities include three schools, a  park, three pubs, three supermarkets, three churches and numerous small shops.

Geography 
It is bordered to the southeast by the River Sheaf and Hutcliffe Wood, to the west by Ecclesall Woods, Millhouses Lane and Button Hill, and to the north by Carter Knowle Road and Bannerdale Road. Running directly alongside the River Sheaf is the long and thin Millhouses Park. The main road through the area is the A621 Abbeydale Road/Abbeydale Road South. The Midland Main Line also runs through Millhouses. Residential development was in a fan-shape focussed on the junction of Abbeydale Road and Millhouses Lane. Most houses in the area were built in the 1920s although there are some that date from the late 19th century.

History 
In ancient times this area was part of the Barnsdale Forest that, together with Sherwood Forest, made up the forest of the Robin Hood legends. The River Sheaf marked the boundary between the Anglo-Saxon kingdoms of Mercia and Northumbria. In fact the earliest historical record of this area refers to the submission of the Northumbrian army to Egbert of Wessex at nearby Dore in 829.

In the late 12th century Robert Fitz Ranulf gave land for the establishment of an abbey, just south of Millhouses at Beauchief. Over time most of the area now covered by Millhouses had been given to the abbey by the De Ecclesall family. One of the gifts to the monks was the Ecclesall Corn Mill. This mill existed at least as early as 1280 and considerable remnants of it can still be seen at the north end of Millhouses Park.

Millhouses remained mostly agricultural until the 19th century, although two cutlery works had been established in the area: Moscar Wheel, which may originally have been a corn mill, was making cutlery by 1496, and Bartin Wheel was built as a cutler's wheel in 1631. In 1805 a turnpike road was built from Sheffield to Bakewell (now Abbeydale Road), this passed through the area and led to some growth, but it was only with the extension of the Midland Main Line through the valley in 1870 (with a railway station at Millhouses) and the subsequent arrival of trams in 1902 that Millhouses began to develop as an affluent residential suburb. As well as a railway station, an engine shed was built in 1901. This closed in the 1962, but the shed building is still in use as an industrial site and the shed's sidings are now Tesco supermarket's Park and Ride.

Noteworthy buildings in Millhouses include the Grade II listed parish church, Holy Trinity, which was constructed in 1937,
 and the former Millhouses police station building that dates from 1893. The Robin Hood and Wagon and Horses public houses are amongst the neighbourhood's older surviving buildings, both dating from earlier than 1822.

Millhouses Park

Between Abbeydale Road South and the River Sheaf lies a mile-long public park, with a mixture of green spaces, planted areas and leisure facilities. These include tennis courts, a boating lake and a cafe serving gourmet food.

See also

 Districts of Sheffield
 Millhouses engine shed
 Millhouses & Ecclesall railway station

References and notes

Bibliography

Footnotes

External links
 Sources for the history of Millhouses Produced by Sheffield City Council's Libraries and Archives

Maps

Suburbs of Sheffield